In cosmology, galaxy filaments (subtypes: supercluster complexes, galaxy walls, and galaxy sheets) are the largest known structures in the universe, consisting of walls of gravitationally bound galaxy superclusters. These massive, thread-like formations can reach 80 megaparsecs h−1 (or of the order of 160 to 260 million light-years) and form the boundaries between large voids.

Formation
In the standard model of the evolution of the universe, galactic filaments form along and follow web-like strings of dark matter—also referred to as the galactic web or cosmic web. It is thought that this dark matter dictates the structure of the Universe on the grandest of scales. Dark matter gravitationally attracts baryonic matter, and it is this "normal" matter that astronomers see forming long, thin walls of super-galactic clusters.

Discovery
Discovery of structures larger than superclusters began in the late-1980s. In 1987, astronomer R. Brent Tully of the University of Hawaii's Institute of Astronomy identified what he called the Pisces–Cetus Supercluster Complex. In 1989, the CfA2 Great Wall was discovered, followed by the Sloan Great Wall in 2003. On January 11, 2013, researchers led by Roger Clowes of the University of Central Lancashire announced the discovery of a large quasar group, the Huge-LQG, which dwarfs previously discovered galaxy filaments in size. In November 2013, using gamma-ray bursts as reference points, astronomers discovered the Hercules–Corona Borealis Great Wall, an extremely huge filament measuring more than 10 billion light-years across.

Filaments
The filament subtype of filaments have roughly similar major and minor axes in cross-section, along the lengthwise axis.

 A short filament, detected by identifying an alignment of star-forming galaxies, in the neighborhood of the Milky Way and the Local Group was proposed by Adi Zitrin and Noah Brosch. The reality of this filament, and the identification of a similar but shorter filament, were the result of a study by McQuinn et al. (2014) based on distance measurements using the TRGB method.

Galaxy walls
The galaxy wall subtype of filaments have a significantly greater major axis than minor axis in cross-section, along the lengthwise axis.
 		 	

 A "Centaurus Great Wall" (or "Fornax Great Wall" or "Virgo Great Wall") has been proposed, which would include the Fornax Wall as a portion of it (visually created by the Zone of Avoidance) along with the Centaurus Supercluster and the Virgo Supercluster also known as our Local Supercluster within which the Milky Way galaxy is located (implying this to be the Local Great Wall).
 A wall was proposed to be the physical embodiment of the Great Attractor, with the Norma Cluster as part of it. It is sometimes referred to as the Great Attractor Wall or Norma Wall. This suggestion was superseded by the proposal of a supercluster, Laniakea, that would encompass the Great Attractor, Virgo Supercluster, Hydra-Centaurus Superclusters.
 A wall was proposed in 2000 to lie at z=1.47 in the vicinity of radio galaxy B3 0003+387.
 A wall was proposed in 2000 to lie at z=0.559 in the northern Hubble Deep Field (HDF North).

Map of nearest galaxy walls

Large Quasar Groups
Large quasar groups (LQGs) are some of the largest structures known. They are theorized to be protohyperclusters/proto-supercluster-complexes/galaxy filament precursors.

Supercluster complex

Maps of large-scale distribution

See also

 List of largest cosmic structures
 Galaxy
 Galaxy cluster
 Galaxy supercluster
 Illustris project
 Large-scale structure
 List of galaxies
 List of galaxy groups and clusters
 Void (astronomy)

References

Further reading
 Kevin A. Pimbblet, arXiv, 14 March 2005.

External links
 Pictures of the filamentary network
 The Universe Within One Billion Light Years with List of Nearby Superclusters (from the Atlas of the Universe):

 
Large-scale structure of the cosmos